Reza Baghi (also Romanized as Reẕā Bāghī; also known as Reẕā Bāgh and Riza Bāgh) is a village in Pish Khowr Rural District, Pish Khowr District, Famenin County, Hamadan Province, Iran. At the 2006 census, its population was 82, in 25 families.

References 

Populated places in Famenin County